The 13th Presidium of the Supreme People's Assembly (SPA) was elected by the 1st Session of the 13th Supreme People's Assembly on 9 April 2014.  It was replaced on 11 April 2019 by the 14th SPA Presidium.

Members

Add-ons

Replacements

References

Citations

Bibliography
Books:
 

13th Supreme People's Assembly
Presidium of the Supreme People's Assembly
2014 establishments in North Korea
2019 disestablishments in North Korea